Arambag subdivision is an administrative subdivision of the Hooghly district in the Indian state of West Bengal.

Overview 
Arambag subdivision is a rural dominated area. All the blocks in the subdivision have cent percent population living in the rural areas. Arambagh municipality is the only urban area in the entire subdivision. A major portion of the subdivision is part of the Dwarakeswar-Damodar inter-riverine plain with alluvial soil. Only a small portion in the western fringe of the subdivision is upland. The entire area is a part of the Gangetic Delta.

History
Arambagh subdivision was formed in 1819. It was earlier known as Jahanabad. On 19 April 1900 the name of Jahanabad was changed to Arambagh, which means "the garden of ease and comfort". Bankim Chandra Chattopadhyay was in-charge of the subdivision in its earlier days. The ruins of a fort at Gar Mandaran provided the setting for Bankim Chandra Chattopadhyay's novel Durgeshnandini, published in 1865.

Subdivisions
The Hooghly district is divided into the following administrative subdivisions:

Administrative units
Arambag subdivision has 4 police stations, 6 community development blocks, 6 panchayat samitis, 63 gram panchayats, 567 mouzas, 554 inhabited villages and 1 municipality. The single municipality is at Arambag. The subdivision has its headquarters at Arambag.

Gram panchayats
The subdivision contains 63 gram panchayats under 6 community development blocks:

 Arambagh block consists of 15 gram panchayats, viz. Arandi–I, Gourhati–II, Malaypur–I, Salepur–I, Arandi–II, Harinkhola–I, Malaypur–II, Salepur–II, Batanal, Harinkhola–II, Mayapur–I, Tirole, Gourhati–I, Madhabpur and Mayapur–II.
 Khanakul I block consists of 13 gram panchayats, viz. Arunda, Khanakul–II, Pole–II, Thakuranichak, Balipur, Kishorepur–I, Rammohan–I, Ghoshpur, Kishorepur–II, Rammohan–II, Khanakul–I, Pole–I and Tantisal.
 Khanakul II block consists of 11 gram panchayats, viz. Chingra, Marokhana, Palashpai–I, Rajhati–II, Dhanyagori, Natibpur–I, Palashpai–II, Sabalsinghapur, Jagatpur, Natibpur–II and Rajhati–I.
 Goghat I block consists of seven gram panchayats, viz. Bali, Goghat, Nakunda, Saora, Bhadur, Kumarsa and Raghubati.
 Goghat II block consists of nine gram panchayats, viz. Badanganj–Falui–I, Hazipur, Mandaran, Badanganj–Falui–II, Kamarpukur, Paschimpara, Bengai, Kumarganj and Shyambazar.
 Pursurah block consists of eight gram panchayats, viz. Bhangamora, Dihibadpur, Pursurah–I, Shyampur, Chiladangi, Kelepara, Pursurah–II and Sreerampur.

Police stations
Police stations in Arambag subdivision have the following  jurisdiction:

Blocks
Community development blocks in Arambag subdivision are:

Economy

Industries
Arambagh Hatcheries Ltd. is a poultry and egg related industry based at Arambag. It was incorporated in 1973.

Agriculture
Hooghly is an agriculturally prosperous district of West Bengal. Although the economy has been shifting away from agriculture, it is still the pre-dominant economic activity and the main source of livelihood for the rural people of the district. One third of the district income comes from agriculture. Given below is an overview of the agricultural production (all data in tonnes) for Arambagh subdivision, other subdivisions and the Hooghly district, with data for the year 2013-14.

Handloom weaving
The handloom sarees of Dhaniakhali, Begampur, Jangipara, Rajbalhat areas and dhutis of Haripal, Rajbalhat, Khanakul areas of Hooghly district are widely familiar.

Education
Hooghly district had a literacy rate of 81.80% as per the provisional figures of the census of India 2011. Chinsurah subdivision had a literacy rate of 79.17%, Chandannagore subdivision 83.01%, Srirampore subdivision 86.13% and Arambag subdivision 79.05.  

Given in the table below (data in numbers) is a comprehensive picture of the education scenario in Hooghly district for the year 2013-14:

Note: Primary schools include junior basic schools; middle schools, high schools and higher secondary schools include madrasahs; technical schools include junior technical schools, junior government polytechnics, industrial technical institutes, industrial training centres, nursing training institutes etc.; technical and professional colleges include engineering colleges, medical colleges, para-medical institutes, management colleges, teachers training and nursing training colleges, law colleges, art colleges, music colleges etc. Special and non-formal education centres include sishu siksha kendras, madhyamik siksha kendras, centres of Rabindra mukta vidyalaya, recognised Sanskrit tols, institutions for the blind and other handicapped persons, Anganwadi centres, reformatory schools etc.

The following institutions are located in Arambagh subdivision:
Netaji Mahavidyalaya, a general degree college, was established at Arambag in 1948.
Raja Rammohan Roy Mahavidyalaya, a general degree college, was established at Radhanagore in 1964.
Sri Ramkrishna Sarada Vidyamahapith, a general degree college, was established at Kamarpukur in 1959.
Arambagh Girls' College, a general degree college for girls, was established at Arambag in 1995.
Kabikankan Mukundaram Mahavidyalaya, a general degree college, was established at Keshabpur in 2007.
Aghorekamini Prakashchandra Mahavidyalaya, a general degree college, was established at Bengai in 1959.

Healthcare
The table below (all data in numbers) presents an overview of the medical facilities available and patients treated in the hospitals, health centres and sub-centres in 2014 in Hooghly district.  
 

.* Excluding nursing homes

Medical facilities in Arambagh subdivision are as follows:
Hospital: (Name, location, beds)
Arambagh Subdivisonal Hospital, Arambagh Municipality, 250 beds.

Rural Hospitals: (Name, block, location, beds) 
Akri Shrirampur Rural Hospital, Pursurah CD Block, Akri Shrirampur, 30 bed.
Khanakul Rural Hospital, Khanakul I CD Block, Khanakul, 60 beds.
Natibpur Rural Hospital, Khanakul II CD Block, Natibpur, 30 beds.
Dakshin Narayanpur Rural Hospital, Arambagh CD Block, Dakshin Narayanpur, 30 beds.
Kamarpukur Rural Hospital, Goghat II CD Block, Kamarpukur, 60 beds.
Goghat Block Primary Health Centre, Goghat I CD Block, Goghat, 10 beds.

Primary Health Centres (CD Block-wise)(CD Block, PHC name/location, beds) 
Arambagh CD Block: Malaypur, PO Keshabpur, (10 beds), Selepur, PO Chuadanga (10 beds), Muthadanga, PO Mayapur (10 beds), Dihibagnan (4 beds).
Goghat I CD Block: Nakunda (6 beds).
Goghat II CD Block: Jitarpur, PO Bhuskunda (2 beds), Taraghat (10 beds), Badanganj (2 beds).
Khanakul I CD Block: Ghoshpur, PO Pilkhan (10 beds), Tantisal (10 beds), Harimohan Golap Sundari, PO Raghunathpur (4 beds).
Khanakul II CD Block: Sabalsinghpur (10 beds), Morakhana (2 beds), Ramchandrapur (6 beds)
Pursurah CD Block: Fatepur, PO Parshyampur (4 beds), Dihibatpur, PO Alati (10 beds).

Electoral constituencies
Lok Sabha (parliamentary) and Vidhan Sabha (state assembly) constituencies in Arambag subdivision were as follows:

References

Subdivisions of West Bengal
Subdivisions in Hooghly district